Bahar Kahur (also Romanized as Bahār Kahūr) is a village in Jahadabad Rural District, in the Central District of Anbarabad County, Kerman Province, Iran. At the 2006 census, its population was 59, in 14 families.

References 

Populated places in Anbarabad County